Vittorio Emanuele Dabormida, 2nd Count Dabormida, OSML, OCI (25 November 1842 – 1 March 1896) was an Italian general and noble, mostly known for his role during the First Italo-Ethiopian War. He died in combat at Adwa, and was posthumously awarded the Gold Medal of Military Valor.

Early life 
Dabormida was the son of Count Giuseppe Dabormida, an artillery colonel, Minister of War of the Kingdom of Sardinia during the First Italian War of Independence and Foreign Minister in the first Cavour government. He was admitted in the Royal Military Academy in 1859, and graduated in December 1861 as an artillery sub-lieutenant. In March 1862 was attached to the Artillery Staff, then, a year later, assigned to the 5th Artillery Regiment. On 31 December 1863 was promoted to lieutenant. During the 1866 Italo-Austrian War he commanded a supply column, and by December was moved to the Army Staff. A year later he entered the newly founded School of War for a two-year specialization course. Promoted captain in 1868, in 1870 he started teaching courses of Military History in the same institution.

Army Staff and Academic career 
Dabormida served as a professor in the School of War for eight years, until promoted Infantry major in 1878. Quite a prolific writer, he published Sunti sullo svolgimento storico dell'arte della guerra prima della rivoluzione francese (trans. "Essays on the history of the art of war before the French revolution") in 1874, and in 1876 Vincenzo Gioberti e il Dabormida, a defence of his father's actions against the accusations made by Vincenzo Gioberti in 1857. In 1878 he wrote La difesa delle nostre frontiere occidentali in relazione agli ordinamenti militari odierni (trans. "The defence of our western borders with respect to current military organization"): the increasing attrition with France after the collapse of the Second French Empire led him to analyze the possibility of a conflict between France and Italy. Dabormida urged the usage of Alps as a strong defensive line capable of restoring balance of force in a fight with the more numerous French, against the common opinion based on Napoleonic experience that deemed the mountains as a mere delaying obstacle.

The same year he published, on the same matter, a study: Ordinamento militare delle popolazioni alpine (trans. "Military organization of Alpine people") and, in August 1879, he was back to the School of War as full professor. While maintaining his teaching activity, in May 1880 Dabormida was re-attached to the Army Staff, and by November 1881 he was nominated secretary to the Army Chief of Staff, general Cosenz. Promoted Lt. colonel in 1883, he served in this capacity until June 1887, when he was reassigned to the 3rd Infantry Regiment as provisional commander. In April 1888 he was promoted colonel and confirmed in his role. Two years later, Dabormida was again reassigned to the Army Staff. In 1891, he published in Rome La battaglia dell'Assietta, a study wrote for his students when he was a teacher in the School of War about the 1747 Battle of Assietta.

Promoted major general in July 1895, he received the command of "Cagliari" Brigade. On 12 January 1896, he was shipped to Eritrea and took command of the 2nd Infantry Brigade.

Battle of Adwa and death 

On 12 February, pressed by the Prime Minister Francesco Crispi, Baratieri had his forces dug in at strong positions at Sauria,  from Menelik's camp. By 27 February, the army had only a few days supply left and the intelligence wrongly reported that the Ethiopians were scattered across the hills of Adwa, foraging. Unable or unwilling to decide between a temporary withdrawal or a small advance, the Governor asked for the advice of his brigade commanders: Giuseppe Arimondi, Matteo Albertone, Dabormida and the newly appointed Giuseppe Ellena.  Dabormida joined Arimondi and Albertone in their call for an aggressive approach, reportedly arguing that, since the troops morale was high, a retreat would only bring it down. He declared that Italy would prefer the loss of two to three thousand men to a dishonorable retreat.

On 28 February, Baratieri resolved to advance towards the Ethiopian camp at Adwa. His orders on 29 February called for an offensive thrust to occupy a solid position on the hill east of Adwa. From there on he could react according to the moves of the Abyssinians; defend if attacked, keep the position if unmolested or attack the rearguard of the Negus' army if it retreated from Adwa. The field force was ordered to move during the night; Albertone and the Native Brigade on the left flank, was to occupy the Kidane Meret peak, Dabormida on the right flank, the mountain of the Rebbi Arienni and Arimondi, with the center, again the Rebbi Arienni, in a less prominent position. The reserve brigade of General Ellena was stationed behind Arimondi.

Night march 
At 21:30 the brigades of Albertone, Arimondi and Dabormida were on their way, each following different roads; Ellena's brigade was to follow Arimondi three hours later, with Baratieri and his staff.

Uninvolved in the marching incidents between Arimondi and Albertone, Dabormida reach his intended position at 5:15 on 1 March, fifteen minutes before his colleague. By the time he deployed his men, the isolated force of Albertone on the Kidane Meret was launching its attack on the Ethiopian camp. The Native Brigade at first met little resistance, but was soon repulsed by the larger number of enemy troops.

Dabormida's advance 
At 6:45 Baratieri, who had spent a full hour reconnoitering the ground on which he planned to fight, reached the Rebbi Arienni and heard the sounds of the ongoing battle on the left. He ordered Dabormida to advance to the Spur of Belah and support by fire Albertone, whom he assumed to be at the "false" Kidane Meret or little ahead. Once Dabormida got his brigade to the Spur, he discovered Albertone was much further off than supposed, and continued to slowly march westwards, across difficult ground. By 7:45 his rearguards had left the Hill and Spur of Belah, and, following the terrain's nature, Dabormida's brigade entered the west–east arm of the Mariam Shavitu valley, about 3 miles north of Albertone's Native Brigade.

By 8:15 the morning mist cleared: Baratieri climbed the slopes of Mount Eshasho to survey the situation, and discovered that Albertone was heavily engaged. At 8:30 the advanced 1st Native Battalion of Albertone's command was forced to retreat in disarray: Baratieri sent a message to Dabormida, ordering him to aid Albertone, but the messenger decided he could turn back once he had met a courier from Dabormida. The commander of the 2nd Infantry Brigade informed his commanding officer that he was "holding out his hand to Albertone", and Baratieri assumed the 2nd Brigade was about to link up with Albertone. Baratieri, still assuming Dabormida had a strong hold over the Spur of Belah, sent two other messengers, but neither reach Dabormida. Actually, the major general had left at the Spur only local auxiliaries, and about 9:30 they had been driven off by infiltrating Ethiopians, who also started to attack the isolated 2nd Brigade.

Awards and decorations 
  Gold Medal of Military Valor – Adwa, 1 March 1896 
  Officer of the Order of Saint Maurice and Lazarus – August 1895
  Commander of the Order of the Crown of Italy – January 1895.

Notes

References

Bibliography 
 

1842 births
1896 deaths
Italian generals
Italian military personnel of the First Italo-Ethiopian War
Italian military personnel killed in the First Italo-Ethiopian War
Military personnel from Turin